Mastertapes is a BBC Radio 4 programme, presented by John Wilson, which discusses the making of significant rock albums. The featured artists are interviewed, in front of an audience, and perform exclusive live tracks, many of which are available on the programme's website. Each album is discussed over two half-hour programmes: the "A side" programme features the artist being interviewed by Wilson, with the "B side" programme featuring questions from the studio audience.

Episodes 

Each episode has two parts ("Side A" and "Side B"). The "First broadcast" date refers to "Side A".

Series 1

Series 2

Series 3

Series 4

Series 5

Series 6

References

External links 

 BBC web page

Mastertapes